Karim Khalili is an Afghan politician serving as leader of the Hezb-e Wahdat Islami Afghanistan party. Most recently he was Chief of the Afghan High Peace Council from 2017 until its dissolvement in 2019. He was selected as a candidate for Second Vice President of Afghanistan in 2002 by Hamid Karzai; they were elected in 2004 and left office in 2014. Since 1989, he has also been one of the main leaders of the Wahdat political party of Hazara.

Biography
Khalili was born in the Wardak Province of Afghanistan in 1950 as either Muhammad Karim Khalili or Abdul Karim Khalili and is of Hazara descent. He attended religious schools during his childhood and moved to Kabul in 1970 to continue his education He participated in the Afghanistan resistance during Soviet invasion. He also served as Minister of Finance of Afghanistan during the Mujahideen government in the early 1990s.

Personal life
He has two sons, the older of which is Mohammad Taqi Khalili, Afghanistan's Ambassador to Azerbaijan.

References

Vice presidents of Afghanistan
Economy ministers of Afghanistan
Finance Ministers of Afghanistan
Hazara politicians
Living people
Mujahideen members of the Soviet–Afghan War
Hezbe Wahdat politicians
Afghan Shia Muslims
People from Maidan Wardak Province 
1950 births